Marysville is a town, 34 kilometres north-east of Healesville and 41 kilometres south of Alexandra, in the Shire of Murrindindi in Victoria, Australia. The town, which previously had a population of over 500 people, was devastated by the Murrindindi Mill bushfire on 7 February 2009.  On 19 February 2009 the official death toll was 45. Around 90% of the town's buildings were destroyed. Prior to the Black Saturday fire the population in 2006 was 519.  At the 2011 Census, the population had reduced to 226, by the 2016 census it had risen to 394.

History 
The city was established as a stopping point on the Yarra Track, the route to the Woods Point and Upper Goulburn goldfields, with a butcher's shop and store in existence by the time the town was surveyed in 1864. It prospered following the reconstruction of the Yarra Track as an all weather dray and coach road under engineer Clement Wilks in the 1870s. It was named after Mary Steavenson, the wife of Assistant Commissioner of Roads and Bridges John Steavenson after whom the popular Steavenson Falls are named. The Marysville Post Office opened on 1 March 1865 followed by a school in 1870, and a public hall, library and mechanics institute in 1890. By the 1920s, Marysville had become a tourist destination, with the Marysville Tourist and Progress Association formed in 1924. Attractions promoted at the time were fern gullies, views, and walking tracks to Steavenson Falls. Twelve guest houses had been established by 1920, one of the best known of these being the Cumberland Guest House. At this time a rail service operated between Melbourne and nearby Healesville, and the town became a popular destination for couples on their honeymoon.

In 2004 a telemovie, Little Oberon starring Sigrid Thornton, was filmed in and around Marysville.

The town came under serious threat during the Black Friday bushfires in 1939, residents saw the fire cross from Mt Gorden to Mount Margaret. At that time only one house in Marysville belonging to Stan Postlethwaite was destroyed. The No.1 Mill 5 miles from Marysville was destroyed and the town of Narbethong was wiped out. The Ash Wednesday bushfires of 1983 also came close to Marysville but burnt around the town and caused no damage to property.

Black Saturday bushfires 
On 7 February 2009, a bushfire destroyed most of the town, including the primary school, police station, The Cumberland, and almost all of its houses.

Residents able to leave the town just prior to the fire were directed to a temporary relief centre at Alexandra High School. Others sheltered overnight in Gallipoli Park before being evacuated to Alexandra.

The entire town was declared a crime scene and was effectively closed off while Victorian and Federal police recovered bodies and conducted investigations. It was reopened to the public on 23 March.

In February 2014 a class action trial against electricity company SP AusNet was due to begin in the Victorian Supreme Court. It was alleged that the fire was caused by a "break in an electrical conductor on a power pole near the Murrindindi Saw Mill." An  settlement was announced before the trial began.

The town before the fire is viewable in Google Maps Street View which provides a virtual time-capsule tour of the area. Public Relations manager for Google Australia, Annie Baxter said: "We've received a number of requests to consider retaining the Street View imagery for fire-affected areas, and it's something we're looking into... As of June 2014 the imagery has been updated to images from March 2013, the old imagery still available through the time machine feature."

Industry and employment 
Marysville's primary industry is tourism. Prior to the fire, it contained numerous cafes, art galleries, restaurants, and craft shops. It has been used as a base for the Lake Mountain ski resort. During the snow season, the population of the town has been known to double or even triple, due to the influx of other hospitality and tourism caterers, such as ski hire, toboggan hire, chain hire, and many other profitable ventures associated with snowplay and skiing. During summer Marysville is frequented by many bikers, particularly on weekends. Marysville is cradled between two of Victoria's best motorcycling roads, the Black Spur & The Reefton Spur. It is also popular with recreational cyclists.  There are many tourist attractions throughout the area, such as Bruno's Sculpture Garden (which was badly damaged in the 2009 fires but mostly restored since), and Steavenson Falls. The town is also used as an access point to Yarra Ranges National Park and Upper Yarra Reservoir Park.

According to The Wilderness Society, the local community has opposed logging, which threatened the area's old growth forests and tourism. A large proportion of the logging and roading is in close vicinity to the beech forests seen by tourists visiting the Lady Talbot Drive in the Upper Taggerty catchment. Marysville depends heavily on tourism for its economic prosperity and employment. In contrast, the agriculture, forestry and fishing industries combined accounted for less than three percent of the region's employment in 1995.

The local water treatment plant run by Goulburn Valley Water claimed the 2015 title of best drinking water in state and national titles and later second best in the world. It now boasts about its water in a road sign and on a special water fountain in the town.

Gallery

References

External links

Marysville – Government tourism site
Marysville Tourism
The Black Spur
The Reefton Spur
Marysville Visitor Guides - www.Marysville.com.au

Towns in Victoria (Australia)
Shire of Murrindindi